The 2010 Men's Asian Games Volleyball Tournament was the 14th edition of the event, organized by the Asian governing body, the AVC. It was held in Guangzhou, China from November 13 to November 26, 2010.

Squads

Results
All times are China Standard Time (UTC+08:00)

Preliminary

Group A

|}

Group B

|}

Group C

|}

Group D

|}

Second round
 The results and the points of the matches between the same teams that were already played during the preliminary round shall be taken into account for the second round.

Group E

|}

Group F

|}

Group G

|}

Group H

|}

Placement 13–16

Semifinals

|}

Placement 15th–16th

|}

Placement 13th–14th

|}

Placement 9–12

Semifinals

|}

Placement 11th–12th

|}

Placement 9th–10th

|}

Final round

Quarterfinals

|}

Placement 5–8

|}

Semifinals

|}

Placement 7th–8th

|}

Placement 5th–6th

|}

Bronze medal match

|}

Gold medal match

|}

Final standing

References

Results

External links
Official website

Men